Unione Sportiva Dilettantistica Noto Calcio is an Italian association football club located in Noto, Sicily. It currently plays in Serie D.

History
The club was founded in 1963 as Netina.

In summer 1980 it was merged with Franco Mola and was renamed with the current name.

In the 2009–10 season of Eccellenza Sicily/B it was promoted to Serie D.

Colors and badge
Its official color is garnet.

Stadium
The sports center at which the known football matches internal dispute arises in Contrada Zupparda less than a mile from the town of Noto. The structure is dedicated to the memory of Giovanni Palatucci, police officer, decorated for bravery medal by the civil and the title of "Servant of God" for having rescued, during the Second World War, more than 5000 people from the Nazi-Fascist .

The sports center was born in the '80s with the funds allocated in view of the Italian World Cup. The structure was not completed, it remained unused, a victim of vandalism and fell completely abandoned for twenty years. In May 2010 after extensive renovations, the sports center was inaugurated and handed over to the sports Noto.
The center hosts a sports stadium, a tennis workout, swimming pool, tennis courts, basketball and volleyball, Motocross, a multi-service building and large parking areas internal and external.

The stadium has a natural grass playing field and the central court has about 5000 seats, with the press box, and just expects the construction of the roof.
The multi-service building has direct access to the playing field of the stadium, inside it contains the changing rooms for teams and referees, the infirmary, as well as gyms, offices and conference rooms.

References

External links
Official homepage

Football clubs in Italy
Football clubs in Sicily
Association football clubs established in 1963
Italian football clubs established in 1963